William Ernest Powell Giles (20 July 1835 – 13 November 1897), best known as Ernest Giles, was an Australian explorer who led five major expeditions to parts of South Australia and Western Australia.

Early life 
Ernest Giles was born in Bristol, England, the eldest son of William Giles ( – 28 May 1860), a merchant, and Jane Elizabeth Giles, née Powell ( – 15 March 1879).
Their family had been in comfortable circumstances but fell on hard times and emigrated to Australia. William Giles was living in North Adelaide by 1850 and Melbourne by 1853. William was later employed by  Customs in Victoria, and his wife founded a successful school for girls in that colony.

Giles was educated at Christ's Hospital school, Newgate, London. In 1850, at the age of 15, he emigrated to Australia, joining his parents in Adelaide. In 1852 Giles went to the Victorian goldfields, then became a clerk at the Post Office in Melbourne, and later at the County Court. Soon tiring of town life Giles went to the back country and gained valuable experience as a bushman. In 1865, he explored north-west of the Darling River in the Yancannia Range looking for pastoral country and land capable of cultivating hemp, as it was valuable for rope at the time.

Exploration  

Giles did not attempt an organised expedition until 1872, when with two other men he left Chambers Pillar in the Northern Territory), on 22 August and traversed much uncharted country to the north-west and west. Finding their way barred by Lake Amadeus and that their horses were getting very weak, a return was made to the Finke River and then to Charlotte Waters and Adelaide, where Giles arrived in January 1873. Giles looked upon his expedition as a failure, but he had done well considering the size and equipment of his party.

Second expedition 
Giles' friend Baron von Mueller raised a subscription so that a new expedition could be made. The services of William Tietkens as first assistant were obtained, and with two other men a start was made on 4 August 1873. The journey began considerably south from the previous expedition and from the Alberga River a generally western course was traversed. A month later in the Musgrave Ranges a fine running river was found and named the Ferdinand and by 3 October 1873 the party was approaching longitude 128 East. The country was extremely dry and though tested in various directions it was a constant struggle to get enough water to keep the horses going. Early in November, having passed longitude 126, a partial return was made and on 20 December 1873 the neighbourhood of Mount Scott was reached. A turn to the north and then west was made and the farthest westerly point was reached on 23 April 1874. Giles and one of the men, Alfred Gibson, had been scouting ahead when the latter's horse died. Giles gave him his own horse with instructions to follow their tracks back and obtain assistance. Giles made his way back to their depot on foot in eight days, almost completely exhausted, to find that Gibson had not reached the camp. A search was made for him for several days without success. The stores were almost finished, nothing further could be done, and on 21 May 1874 the return journey began. Giles named the desert Gibson Desert after his companion. On 24 June 1874 they were on a good track to the Finke River and on 13 July 1874 Charlotte Waters was reached. Giles had again failed to cross the continent, but in the circumstances all had been done that was possible.

Giles was the first European to see the rock formations named The Olgas, now officially known by  Kata Tjuta/Mount Olga, and Lake Amadeus. He had wanted to name these Mt Mueller and Lake Ferdinand respectively, to honour his benefactor Baron Ferdinand von Mueller, however Mueller prevailed on him to instead honour the King Amadeus of Spain and Queen Olga of Württemberg. Giles supposedly discovered Uluru, but was beaten to the claim by a competing explorer, William Gosse.

Third, fourth and fifth expeditions 

Early in 1875 Giles prepared his diaries for publication under the title Geographic Travels in Central Australia, and on 13 March 1875, with the generous help of Sir Thomas Elder, he began his third expedition.  Proceeding far northwards from Fowler's Bay, the country was found to be very dry. Retracing his steps Giles turned east, and eventually going round the north side of Lake Torrens, reached Elder's station at Beltana.

At Beltana the preparations for his fourth journey were made, and with Tietkens again his lieutenant, and with a caravan of camels, a start was made on 6 May. Afghan cameleer Mahomet Saleh, who had accompanied explorer Peter Warburton to Western Australia two years previously, drove and managed the camels. They reached Port Augusta on 23 May and, after taking a northerly course to clear the lakes, followed a generally westerly course. Some water was carried, and the party was saved the continual excursions in search of water for horses that had caused so much difficulty during previous expeditions. Towards the end of September, over  had been covered in 17 days without finding water, when on 25 September one of the Aboriginal guides in the expedition party, Tommy Oldham, found an abundant supply in a small hollow between sand dunes at a location which Giles subsequently named Queen Victoria Spring, and the party was saved. After a rest of nine days the journey was resumed on 6 October, still heading west. Ten days later the expedition was attacked by a large number of Aborigines and Giles fired on them. On 4 November they met a white stockman at Tootra out-camp, east of Bindi Bindi, Western Australia. Their course was west to Walebing Station, then south-west and on 11 November they arrived at New Norcia where they were welcomed by Bishop Salvado. On 17 November 1875 the party arrived at Guildford, and at Perth the next day, where they received an enthusiastic reception.

Giles stayed for two months at Perth. They arrived at Adelaide in September 1876, after a good journey during which the camels were found to be invaluable.

Late life and legacy 

Giles worked as a land classifier in the Western District of Victoria from 1877–79.

In 1880 he published The Journal of a Forgotten Expedition, an account of his second and third expeditions, then, in 1889, appeared Australia Twice Traversed: The Romance of Exploration in two substantial volumes. This gives an account of his five expeditions. He made a number of other minor journeys and his last years were spent as a clerk in the Inspector of Mines' office at Coolgardie, where his great knowledge of the interior was always available for prospectors. Giles was made a fellow and awarded the Patron's Medal of the Royal Geographical Society in 1880 and was made Cavaliere dell'Ordine della Corona d'Italia (Knight of the Order of the Crown of Italy) by King Vittorio Emanuele II.

Despite his explorations, the various Australian governments at the time turned their respective backs on his achievements once they had been completed, and refused to patronise any further exploits or give him much in the way of financial reward. Governor Sir William Jervois claimed on 11 October 1881, "I am informed that he gambles and that his habits are not always strictly sober".

After a short illness Giles died of pneumonia at his nephew's house in Coolgardie on 13 November 1897 and was buried at the Coolgardie Cemetery. He was unmarried. It was reported at the time: 

H. H. Finlayson in The Red Centre: man and beast in the heart of Australia (1935) said of Giles:

In 1976 he was honoured on a postage stamp bearing his portrait issued by Australia Post.

Mount Giles, the third highest mountain in the Northern Territory; Lake Giles, 160 km (100 mi) north of Southern Cross, Western Australia; and the Giles Weather Station, near the Western Australian-South Australian border, were named after him.

Family
 William Giles (c. 1795 – 28 May 1860) of HM Customs, Victoria and Jane Elizabeth Giles, née Powell (c. 1804 – 15 March 1879).
William Ernest Giles (20 July 1835 – 13 November 1897), the subject of this article.
Eldest daughter Jane Rebecca Giles (died 26 November 1911) married George Duff Gill (died 7 December 1883) in Adelaide on 10 January 1850, later of Kew, Victoria; she died at St Peters, South Australia. The George Gill Range was named for him by Giles on 30 October 1872.
Second son Henry Albert Sydney Giles (c. 1840 – 8 December 1853) died in Melbourne.
Helen Sarah Giles (died 4 January 1907) married Stephen Vine Buckland (died 27 October 1886), prominent lawyer of Geelong, Victoria.
Third daughter Harriet Eliza New Giles ( – 26 July 1921) married Henry Notley Hull (c. 1821 – 25 February 1884) on 17 August 1871.
Youngest daughter Alice Mary Giles (c. 1850  – 15 December 1929) married Lionel W. Stanton, the Senior Inspector of Public Schools on 5 January 1892.
Robert Eugene Giles of Hamilton, Victoria accepted the Royal Geographical Society Founder's [sic] medal on his brother's behalf and notified the Press of his late return in 1880. He was later jailed for misappropriation while trustee, then moved to Adelaide, living at St Peters, from where he continued to promote his brother's memory.

Ernest Giles was not related to the explorer Alfred Giles and his brother Christopher, though they knew each other professionally.

Plant names
The unrelated Christopher Giles (c. 1841–1917) assisted Giles's 1872–73 and 1873–74 expeditions, collecting plants for von Mueller in the region of Charlotte Waters.

 The genus Gilesia, which contains one species, Gilesia biniflora , the western tar-vine, is named for both Christopher and Ernest Giles.
 Cyperus gilesii and Panicum gilesii are usually listed as honouring Ernest Giles, but the type details for both species are given by George Bentham only as "Central Australia. Charlotte Waters, Giles".
 Christopher Giles was honoured in the species Eremophila christopheri, the dolomite fuchsia bush, whereas the desert fuchsia, Eremophila gilesii, which is widespread across the region, honours Ernest.

See also 
 Exploration of Australia

References

External links 
 Australia Twice Traversed: The Romance of Exploration at eBooks @ Adelaide
 
 
 William Ernest Powell Giles at Flinders Ranges Research

1835 births
1897 deaths
Explorers of Australia
Explorers of Western Australia
Explorers of South Australia
Explorers from Bristol
Nullarbor Plain
Deaths from pneumonia in Western Australia